Kristoffer von Hassel (born 2008) is an American boy known for being the world's youngest known hacker and notable for being the youngest "security researcher" listed on Microsoft's Security Techcenter as having exposed a security vulnerability. At the age of five, Hassel exposed security lapses in the Microsoft Live Xbox system, prompting wide media coverage, with some journalists highlighting the dropping age of hackers and their technology mastery.

Personal life
Hassel is the son of Robert Davies, who works in computer security, and Jill Nyahay. They live in Ocean Beach, California. When the media started covering Hassel in early April 2014, he was enrolled in Kindergarten.

Hacking initiative
After wanting to play his father's video games but having parental blocks preventing it, five-year-old Hassel tried hacking into the Xbox Live system by trying different combinations of passwords. Eventually, he found a back door security glitch that allowed him first to enter the wrong password, then in the following screen to enter a series of spaces to unlock the system. After he had "exploited the security hole", Hassel's parents found him playing the restricted video games and sternly asked him how he gained access. After he showed them, Davies contacted Microsoft to let them know about the security problem. Microsoft responded “We’re always listening to our customers and thank them for bringing issues to our attention. We take security seriously at Xbox and fixed the issue as soon as we learned about it.” They also provided Hassel with a free year-long subscription to Microsoft Live Gold, four video games and $50USD.

On its website, Microsoft has listed Hassel as one of its Security Researchers, of whom he is the youngest. Of the people listed on the page as security researchers, he has been called "the most unusual but perhaps the most significant".

Davies has stated that Hassel had also learned "three or four other hacks" by the age of five, including how to bypass smartphone screen locks.

Title
Hassel has been identified as the world's youngest hacker, beating out others who have also been quite young. The Huffington Post has reported on "teenage tech geniuses" and The New York Times has stated "in some hacking circles, 15 would be considered middle aged." They continue to say that the age for hacking, coding, and tech adaptability continues to drop.

See also 
 Exploit (computer security)

References

Living people
Hackers
Xbox
2008 births